Burnside of Duntrune is a hamlet in Angus, Scotland. It is situated 1 km North of Ballumbie on the outskirts of Dundee, on the Fithie Burn.

References

Villages in Angus, Scotland